Best of Both Worlds Tour may refer to:

Tours 
 Best of Both Worlds Tour (Miley Cyrus), 2007–2008
 Best of Both Worlds Tour, a concert tour by Jay-Z and R. Kelly in support for the album Unfinished Business, 2004